Ceratophyllus rauschi is a species of flea in the family Ceratophyllidae. It was described by George P. Holland in 1960, who chose the name of the species to honour the American parasitologist Robert L. Rausch.

References 

Ceratophyllidae
Insects described in 1960